Inventions is the second studio album by the folk guitarist Sandy Bull. It was released in 1965 on Vanguard Records.

Track listing

Personnel 
Sandy Bull – acoustic guitar, banjo, oud, bass guitar, electric guitar, production, engineering
Billy Higgins – drums
Richard Knapp – photography
Don Schlitten – photography

External links

References 

1965 albums
Vanguard Records albums
Sandy Bull albums